"One More Night" is a song recorded by Swedish singer Dinah Nah. The song was released as a digital download in Sweden on 4 February 2017 and peaked at number 59 on the Swedish Singles Chart. It took part in Melodifestivalen 2017, and placed fifth in the first semi-final on 4 February 2017. It was written by Thomas G:son, Jimmy Jansson, Dinah Nah, Dr. Alban.

Track listing

Chart performance

Weekly charts

Release history

References

2017 singles
2016 songs
English-language Swedish songs
Melodifestivalen songs of 2017
Swedish pop songs
Warner Music Group singles
Songs written by Thomas G:son
Songs written by Dr. Alban
Songs written by Jimmy Jansson